Tonicella is a genus of chitons known as the lined chitons. 

The genus name derives from the Greek tonos (something stretched, a brace, a strain) and cell (diminutive).

Species
Species within the genus Tonicella include:
 Tonicella insignis
 Tonicella lineata
 Tonicella lokii
 Tonicella marmorea
 Tonicella rubra
 Tonicella sitkensis
 Tonicella submarmorea
 Tonicella undocaerulea
 Tonicella venusta

References

  Vaught, K.C.; Tucker Abbott, R.; Boss, K.J. (1989). A classification of the living Mollusca. American Malacologists: Melbourne. ISBN 0-915826-22-4. XII, 195 pp.
 Stebbins, T. D.; Eernisse, D. J. (2009). Chitons (Mollusca: Polyplacophora) known from benthic monitoring programs in the Southern California Bight. The Festivus. 41 (6): 53–100, errata.

External links
 Gofas, S.; Le Renard, J.; Bouchet, P. (2001). Mollusca. in: Costello, M.J. et al. (eds), European Register of Marine Species: a check-list of the marine species in Europe and a bibliography of guides to their identification. Patrimoines Naturels. 50: 180-213.

Ischnochitonidae
Taxa named by Philip Pearsall Carpenter
Chiton genera